The Rally of Democrats (RDD) is a minor political party in Gabon.

History
The RDD was established in 1993 by Christian Serge Maronga. Maronga was the party's candidate in 2005 presidential elections, fishing last in a field of five candidates with 0.3% of the vote.

References

Political parties in Gabon
1993 establishments in Gabon
Political parties established in 1993